Chithram is a 1988 Indian Malayalam-language screwball comedy film written and directed by Priyadarshan. The film was produced by P. K. R. Pillai under his production house Shirdi Sai Creations, and stars Mohanlal, Ranjini, Nedumudi Venu, Lizy, Poornam Viswanathan, Sreenivasan, M. G. Soman, Sukumari, Maniyanpilla Raju, and Shanavas, while Thikkurissy Sukumaran Nair makes a cameo appearance. The songs were composed by Kannur Rajan and film score by Johnson. Mohanlal won the Kerala State Film Award - Special Jury Award for his performance in this film.

Kalyani (Ranjini) decides to marry her boyfriend Ravi (Shanavas) against her father Ramachandra Menon's (Poornam Viswanathan) wishes. But Ravi breaks up when he learns that she would be disinherited. Kalyani's father, who stays in the United States, is unaware of the breakup and comes home in Kerala to spend time with his daughter and son-in-law. This prompts a family friend and Advocate Kaimal (Nedumudi Venu) to hire a thief, Vishnu (Mohanlal) to act as Kalyani's husband during Menon's vacation stay.

Chithram was released during a Christmas weekend on 23 December 1988. Made on a budget of 44 lakh, the film grossed 3.5 crores at the box office, becoming the highest-grossing Malayalam film at its time.

Plot
Kalyani is the daughter of a wealthy NRI Ramachandran Menon who resides in the United States. Kalyani, brought up in Madras by her father's friend Purushothaman Kaimal, falls in love with another man and decides to marry against the wishes of her father. When her boyfriend finds out that she will be disinherited, he ditches her at the altar. Then her father wrote a letter that he decides to approve her husband and wanted to spend a fortnight's vacation with his daughter and son-in-law in his estate near a tribal community where Menon is the chief. As her father is already ill and because this may be his last vacation, Kalyani and Kaimal want to make it as happy for him as possible. They decide to hide the fact that her boyfriend dumped her.

Vishnu comes into the picture who played a trick on a foreigner by telling lie to him that his brother cannot swim. Then the foreigner jumps into the river and Vishnu then runs off with his clothes. The foreigner questions and asks Kaimal about his clothes, with Kaimal getting slapped. Kaimal then goes to Vishnu and confronts him for stealing the clothes. Vishnu states his urgent need for money and Kaimal hires Vishnu to play the part of the husband for 14 days. Meanwhile, Kalyani's cousin Bhaskaran Nambiar who is the caretaker of the estate was expected to inherit Menon's estate and property when Kalyani was disinherited, is determined not to let go without a fight. He knows that Vishnu is not Kalyani's husband and makes various botched attempts to prove this.

Initially, Vishnu and Kalyani do not get along and keep bickering. But as time passes, Kalyani sees Vishnu's heart as he tied the mangalasutra around her neck, just in time before her father came (Bhaskaran informed him that she didn't have the mangalasutra around her neck).  Kalyani eventually develops an affection towards Vishnu and hopes to marry him for real. A couple of days after they have a mysterious visitor who claims to be a relative of Vishnu.

Finally, it is revealed that Vishnu is actually an escaped convict from jail who is sentenced to death and the visitor turns out to be the prison warden. Vishnu's past is shown in flashback and he was a freelance photographer who was married to a woman named Revathy, a mute dancer. They also had a child. Vishnu discovers that a man was visiting his wife when he was not around and begins to suspect her. Coming home one day he finds the man there and tries to attack him. Revathy dies in the scuffle, Vishnu discovers that the man is actually her brother who is a naxalite. He tells Kalyani that he escaped prison to make money for the surgery of his child.

On the last night of Vishnu's stay at the house, he asks Jail Warden, is it possible for him to live, as he started to like life again. The warden does not reply to this question, as he is helpless regarding this. After a happy fortnight, Kalyani's father returns to the US. The final scene shows the warden taking Vishnu to jail, with Kalyani watching him leave, where his execution awaits him. This film ends with Vishnu and Kalyani waving goodbye.

Cast

Soundtrack
The film's songs were composed by Kannur Rajan and lyrics penned by Shibu Chakravarthy. M. G. Sreekumar sang most of the songs in the film. Carnatic music singer Neyyattinkara Vasudevan was a guest singer. The classical Krithis like "Nagumo" and "Swaminatha" featured in the film gained a mass popularity. Playback singer Sujatha Mohan also sang in the film, marking her return after years of sabbatical. Mohanlal sang two songs "Kaadumi Naadumellam" and "Aey Monnu".

Reception
Chithram was released during a Christmas weekend on 23 December 1988. Upon release, it broke all existing records in Malayalam cinema until then. Released in 21 A class theatres, Chithram ran for 50 days in 16 release theatres, 100 days in 6 theatres, 150 days in 5 theatres, 200 days in 4 theatres, 225 days in 3 theatres and 300 days in 2 theatres. It had a theatrical run of more than 400 days in Little Shenoys (Ernakulam). It completed 366 days run with regular shows in two theatres—Little Shenoys (Ernakulam) and Ajanta (Trivandrum), and 200 days in four theatres—Little Shenoys (Ernakulam), Ajantha (Trivandrum), Asha (Kottayam), and Priya (Palakkad). Made on a budget of 0.44 crore, the film grossed 3.9 crore at the box office, becoming the highest-grossing Malayalam film of its time. The film was a success in Tamil Nadu also.

Remakes

References

External links
 

1988 films
1980s Malayalam-language films
1980s romantic comedy-drama films
1980s musical comedy-drama films
1980s screwball comedy films
Films scored by Kannur Rajan
Films shot in Ooty
Malayalam films remade in other languages
Films directed by Priyadarshan
Indian romantic comedy-drama films
Indian screwball comedy films
1988 comedy films
Indian musical comedy-drama films